The 70th New York Infantry Regiment was one of five infantry regiments formed by former U.S. Congressman Daniel Sickles and established as part of the Excelsior Brigade which fought with the Union Army during multiple key engagements of the American Civil War, including the Chancellorsville, Gettysburg and Overland campaigns. Leaders from the 70th New York recruited men from New Jersey, as well as from cities and small towns across the State of New York.

Service
The regiment was organized in New York City in May 1861 under the authority of the War Department as the 1st Regiment, Sickles' Brigade, at Camp Scott on Staten Island. It mustered into service on June 20, 1861. The 70th left the state for Washington, D.C., on July 23, 1861. It was subsequently attached to Sickles' Brigade, Division of the Potomac, until October, 1861. Then, it was reassigned to Sickles' Brigade, Hooker's Division, Army of the Potomac, until March 1862. (It was formally designated as the 70th Regiment New York Infantry on December 11, 1861.) The 70th was part of the 2nd Brigade, 2nd Division, Third Army Corps, Army of the Potomac, until March 1864. Then it was in the 2nd Brigade, 4th Division, Second Army Corps until May 1864. It finished the war in the 4th Brigade, 3rd Division, Second Army Corps, until July 1864.

Ordered to New York for muster out June 22, 1864. Veterans and Recruits were transferred to the 86th New York Infantry. The 70th mustered out on July 7, 1864, to date from July 1, 1864, after the expiration of its three-year term of enlistment.

The regiment lost during service 9 officers and 181 enlisted men killed and mortally wounded, and 2 officers and 62 enlisted men by disease for a total of 254 fatalities.

Commanding officers and other notable members
 Colonel John Egbert Farnum: His name was marked in the Graffiti House in Brandy Station, Virginia, which served as the headquarters for a division of Third Corps, Army of the Potomac during the post-Battle of Gettysburg pursuit of Confederate General Robert E. Lee's army
 John N. Coyne: U.S. Medal of Honor recipient for capturing an enemy flag in the Battle of Williamsburg, Virginia on May 5, 1862

See also
 List of New York Civil War regiments

References
The Civil War Archives: Union Regimental Histories: New York
 Foner, Eric (1988). Reconstruction: America's Unfinished Revolution, 1863-1877. New York, New York: Harper & Row. .
Table of 70th New York Engagements

Notes

External links
New York State Military Museum and Veterans Research Center - Civil War - 70th Infantry Regiment

Infantry 070
Military history of New York City
Excelsior Brigade
Daniel Sickles
1861 establishments in New York (state)
Military units and formations established in 1861
Military units and formations disestablished in 1864